Reggie Holt is a former safety in the National Football League. He was a member of the Green Bay Packers during the 1995 NFL season. Though he did not see any playing time during the regular season, he did appear in that season's NFC Championship Game during the playoffs. Later he played with the London Monarchs of the World League of American Football in 1997.

References

Green Bay Packers players
London Monarchs players
American football defensive backs
Wisconsin Badgers football players
1971 births
Living people